Edward Alexander Capparis Cannan (25 December 1920 – 18 July 1992) was Bishop of St Helena from 1979 to 1985. He was educated at King's College London, becoming a Bachelor of Divinity (BD) and an Associate of King's College (AKC).

References

Alumni of King's College London
Associates of King's College London
Anglican bishops of St Helena
20th-century Anglican Church of Southern Africa bishops
1920 births
1992 deaths